The East Turkestan Information Center (abbreviated ETIC) is a group affiliated with the East Turkestan independence movement. It was founded in Munich, Germany in 1996, and has an office in Washington, D.C.

The ETIC publishes reports on human rights violations and abuses by the Chinese government towards China's ethnic Uyghur population.

On December 15 2003, the ETIC was designated as a terrorist organization by the Ministry of Public Security of the People's Republic of China, which Oxford Analytica says could be an excuse for repression of the Uyghur population.

References

1996 establishments in Germany
Turkestan
Organizations established in 1996
Organizations designated as terrorist by China
 East Turkestan independence movement